The Immediate Geographic Region of Araçuaí is one of the 7 immediate geographic regions in the Intermediate Geographic Region of Teófilo Otoni, one of the 70 immediate geographic regions in the Brazilian state of Minas Gerais and one of the 509 of Brazil, created by the National Institute of Geography and Statistics (IBGE) in 2017.

Municipalities 
It comprises 8 municipalities.

 Araçuaí    
 Berilo     
 Coronel Murta     
 Francisco Badaró     
 Itinga    
 Jenipapo de Minas     
 José Gonçalves de Minas    
 Virgem da Lapa

See also 

 List of Intermediate and Immediate Geographic Regions of Minas Gerais

References 

Geography of Minas Gerais